Catalan revolt may refer to a number of revolts in Catalonia:

 Reapers' War (1640–1659)
 Revolt of the Barretinas (1687–1689)
 Rising during the War of the Spanish Succession (1705–1714)
 War of the Matiners (1846–1849) 
 Catalan State (1934) during the Events of 6 October (1934)
 Revolutionary Catalonia, during the Spanish Civil War (1936–1939)
 2017 Catalan independence referendum